The Strait of Otranto connects the Adriatic Sea with the Ionian Sea and separates Italy from Albania. The strait is named after the Italian city of Otranto.

History 
Since ancient times, the Strait of Otranto was of vital strategic importance. The Romans used it to transport their troops eastwards. The legions marched to Brundisium (now Brindisi), had only a one-day sea voyage to modern Albania territory and then could move eastwards following the Via Egnatia.

World War I 
During World War I, the strait was of strategic significance. The Allied navies of Italy, France, and Great Britain, by blockading the strait, mostly with light naval forces and lightly armed fishing vessels known as drifters, hindered the cautious Austro-Hungarian Navy from freely entering the Mediterranean Sea, and effectively kept them out of the naval theatre of war. The blockade was known as the 'Otranto Barrage'.

However, the barrage was notoriously ineffective against the German and Austrian U-boats operating out of the Adriatic, which were to plague the Allied powers for most of the war throughout the Mediterranean.

After the fall of the Iron Curtain 
In 1992, Albania and Italy signed a treaty that delimited the continental shelf boundary between the two countries in the Strait. Whatsoever the administration rights over the Strait were given to Albania not changing much from the former deal of Otranto. 

In 1997 and 2004, nearly 100 people died trying to illegally cross the strait following the 1997 unrest in Albania and poor economic conditions in the Tragedy of Otranto and the Karaburun tragedy.

In 2006, the Albanian government imposed a moratorium on motor-powered sailing boats on all lakes, rivers, and seas of Albania to curb organized crime. The only exemption to the rule are government-owned boats, foreign-owned boats, fishing boats, and jet boats. In 2010, the moratorium was extended until 2013.

See also

Otranto Barrage
Otranto Raid
Battle of the Strait of Otranto (disambiguation)
Karaburun tragedy

References 

Otranto
Otranto
Albania–Italy border
International straits
Ionian Sea
Adriatic Sea
Albanian Adriatic Sea Coast
Albanian Ionian Sea Coast